The Final Amendment is a Big Finish Productions audio drama featuring Lisa Bowerman as Bernice Summerfield, a character from the spin-off media based on the long-running British science fiction television series Doctor Who.

Plot 
Benny meets up with an old friend...

Cast
Bernice Summerfield - Lisa Bowerman
Narrator - Nicholas Briggs
Fiona - Ann Bryson
Kadiatu Lethbridge-Stewart - Sara Carver
Bev Tarrant - Louise Faulkner
Jason Kane - Stephen Fewell
Howard - Richard Glaves
Adrian - Harry Myers
Braxiatel - Miles Richardson
Joseph - Steven Wickham

External links
Big Finish Productions - Professor Bernice Summerfield: The Final Amendment

Bernice Summerfield audio plays
Fiction set in the 27th century
Seventh Doctor audio plays